Anglian Water Authority was formed in 1974 by virtue of the Water Act 1973 as one of the regional water authorities. 
It established its headquarters in Huntingdon in Cambridgeshire. The authority boundary was the pre-existing boundaries of the constituent  river authorities whose total area made Anglian Water Authority the largest of the ten newly created Authorities. It subsumed the roles and responsibilities of:
 East Suffolk and Norfolk River Authority
 Essex River Authority (except the part of the area of the Essex River Authority which was included in the area of the Thames Water Authority)           
 Great Ouse River Authority         
 Lincolnshire River Authority        
 Welland and Nene River Authority

It also took over sewage treatment and sewerage responsibilities of all the local authorities in the area with the exception of:   
 Dunstable
 Gainsborough
 Glanford Brigg
 Houghton Regis
 Thurrock

It also became responsible for the water supply functions previously exercised by the following:
 Ipswich Corporation
 Buckingham Corporation
 Norwich Corporation
 Bedfordshire Water Board
 Bucks Water Board
 Colchester and District Water Board
 East Lincolnshire Water Board
 Ely, Mildenhall and Newmarket Water Board
 Higham Ferrers and Rushden Water Board
 Kesteven Water Board
 Lincoln and District Water Board
 Mid-Northamptonshire Water Board
 Nene and Ouse Water Board
 North East Lincolnshire Water Board
 North Lindsey Water Board
 North West Norfolk Water Board
 Peterborough Corporation Water Works
 South Lincolnshire Water Board
 South Norfolk Water Board
 West Suffolk Water Board
 Wisbech and District Water Board
 Cambridge Water Company
 East Anglian Water Company
 Tendring Hundred Waterworks Company

Demise
In 1989, the privatisation of the water industry in England and Wales saw the creation of Anglian Water who took over the water treatment and supply and sewerage and sewage disposal functions. All the remaining regulatory functions including flood control, water quality management, pollution control and water resource management were transferred to the newly created National Rivers Authority, which was subsequently subsumed into the new Environment Agency in 1996.

References

Water supply and sanitation in England
Water management authorities in the United Kingdom
Public utilities established in 1974
Government agencies disestablished in 1989
1974 establishments in England
1989 disestablishments in England